The Jaysh Halab was a coalition of Syrian rebel groups based in rebel-held areas inside the city of Aleppo, Syria. The coalition was created by Hashim al-Sheikh, the former general commander of Ahrar ash-Sham with the intent of unifying various rebel groups in Aleppo. After the announcement, nothing was heard of the group until December 2016.

Initial member groups
The joint operations room consisted of both Sunni Islamist and Salafist factions and some Free Syrian Army groups. On its formation on 6 February 2016, the former Ahrar ash-Sham commander issued an ultimatum that ordered 15 rebel factions to join the group within 72 hours.

 Ahrar ash-Sham
 Northern Division
 16th Division
 1st Regiment
 Mountain Hawks Brigade
 Sultan Murad Division
 Levant Front
 Nour al-Din al-Zenki Movement
 Fastaqim Union
 Muntasir Billah Brigade

Re-activation
On 1 December 2016, during the Aleppo offensive, all rebel groups in southeastern Aleppo reportedly merged into the coalition replacing Fatah Halab in southeastern Aleppo. A new commander, Abu Abdul Rahman Noor was named. On 9 December a new emir was named, Abu Ashida'a

The 2nd iteration of the group includes:

 1st Regiment
 Army of Mujahideen
 Elite Islamic Battalions
 Nour al-Din al-Zenki Movement
 Sham Legion
 Levant Front
 Sultan Murad Division
 Sultan Mehmed the Conqueror Brigade
 Ahrar ash-Sham
 Abu Amara Battalions
 Jaysh al-Islam
 Ashida'a Mujahideen Brigade
 Karm al-Jabal Martyrs Battalion

References

Anti-government factions of the Syrian civil war
Operations rooms of the Syrian civil war
Aleppo Governorate in the Syrian civil war